Rice University's Baker Institute for Public Policy, also known as the Baker Institute, is an American think tank on the campus of Rice University in Houston, Texas. Founded in 1993, it functions as a center for public policy research. It is named for James A. Baker, III, former United States Secretary of State, Secretary of the Treasury, and White House Chief of Staff. It is directed by Ambassador David M. Satterfield and funded mainly by donor contributions, endowments, and research grants.

The institute employs scholars and researchers from a variety of backgrounds. Its current research includes centers for different areas: the Center for Energy Studies, the Center for Health and Biosciences, the Center for the Middle East, the Center for Public Finance, the McNair Center for Entrepreneurship and Innovation, and the Mexico Center. Other programs include Biomedical Research, China Studies, Domestic Health Policy Analysis, Drug Policy, Global Health, International Economics, the Latin America Initiative, Presidential Elections, Religion & Public Policy, Science & Technology Policy, Space Policy, and Women's Rights in the Middle East. The University of Pennsylvania's Think Tanks and Civil Societies Program ranked the Baker Institute third among university-affiliated think tanks from 2017 to 2018.

Alongside the institute's focus on research, it provides programs for undergraduate and graduate students to engage with the world of policy and organizes events in which political, diplomatic, and community leaders speak on Rice's campus.

History
The Baker Institute was founded in 1993. The idea for a public policy institute on campus came from Rice University Political Science professor Richard Stoll. James Baker stated a wish  for the institute to bring together “statesmen, scholars, and students” and to be “a bridge between the world of ideas and the world of action.” In 1994, a ceremony to honor the groundbreaking for the new building brought together four U.S. presidents (Gerald Ford, Jimmy Carter, Ronald Reagan, and George H. W. Bush).  Bush and Ford were present, while Carter and Reagan contributed video messages.

In 1994, Ambassador Djerejian was selected as the institute's founding director.

Research programs

Center for the Middle East
The Baker Institute Center for the Middle East has been involved in conflict resolution projects. The focus of the Center includes the Israeli–Palestinian conflict, the Levant, and Women and Human Rights in the Middle East. Research has focused on the civil war in Syria, security in Afghanistan, U.S. relations in the region, energy as it relates to the Middle East, and analysis of the Iran nuclear deal. The program brings together well-known speakers and researchers to offer their insights into the complex challenges facing the Middle East.

Staff in the Center for the Middle East include Ambassador Edward P. Djerejian and Yair Hirschfeld.

Center for Energy Studies 
The Center for Energy Studies was founded in October 2012 and provides policymakers, corporate leaders and the public with "data-driven analysis of issues that influence energy markets." In 2017 and 2018, the CES was ranked the No. 1 energy- and resource-based think tank according to the University of Pennsylvania's Think Tanks and Civil Societies Program's Global Go To Think Tank Index

China Studies
The Transnational China Project studies contemporary China and the changes that the nation is undergoing. The Transnational China project is also working on transcribing public service announcements from various cities in China. The transcripts are available at the Center for Digital Scholarship at Fondren Library at Rice University.

Drug Policy
The Drug Policy Program focuses on implications of the War on Drugs and “pursues research and open debate on local and national drug policies based on common sense, driven by human rights interests, and focused on reducing the death, disease, crime. and suffering associated with drug use.”

Center for Health and Biosciences
The Center for Health and Biosciences (CHB) focuses on developing health policy recommendations. It combines researchers from Rice University and the Texas Medical Center, who are intended to address four major research themes: U.S. health care, global health, public health, and the future of medicine.

Staff include Vivian Ho and Peter Hotez.

International Economics
The International Economics Program focuses particularly on emerging markets, but also on debt, China's economic growth, and governing the global economy. Policy recommendations are produced on “how global economic trends are developing, and what policies can optimally address the challenges that arise.”

Latin America Initiative
The Latin America Initiative has two main projects, the Americas Project and the Vecinos Lecture Series. The initiative focuses on the challenges and opportunities that face the region and “brings together leading stakeholders from government, the private sector, academia, and civil society to exchange their views on pressing issues confronting the region.”

McNair Center for Entrepreneurship and Innovation

The McNair Center for Entrepreneurship and Innovation aims to provide policymakers, scholars and the general public with comprehensive analyses of the issues that affect entrepreneurship and innovation at three levels: federal and state policy, municipal ecosystems, and academic entrepreneurship and innovation. The center was founded with a gift of $8 million from Robert McNair and his wife Janice, through the Robert and Janice McNair Foundation.

Mexico Center
The Mexico Center works to create policy research on issues that affect the Mexico and the United States. The center's research agenda currently focuses on eight major issues: trade, energy, telecommunications, health care, infrastructure, education, human mobility, and the administration of justice/security.

Politics and Elections
The Presidential Elections program focuses on nonpartisan analysis of presidential elections.

Staff include John P. Williams and Mark P. Jones.

Religion and Public Policy
The Religion Policy Program studies the effects of religion on politics in America and around the world on several topics, including voting patterns, the role of faith-based organizations, conflict resolution, and religious fundamentalism in the Middle East.

Space Policy
The International Space Medicine Summit brings together “leading physicians, space biomedical scientists, engineers, astronauts and cosmonauts from the space-faring nations for high-level discussions about the research needed to prevent and/or mitigate the medical and biomedical challenges spacefarers experience in long-duration spaceflight.”

Staff include George W. S. Abbey and Neal F. Lane.

Science and Technology
The Science and Technology Program focuses on issues that include “space, health, medicine, energy and the environment, national and domestic security, science education, and the public’s understanding and trust of science.”

Notable staff include Robert Bazell, Neal F. Lane, Kristin R.W. Matthews, and Robert Curl.

Major Publications 
The Iraq Study Group  was supported by the Baker Institute and co-chaired by Secretary Baker. It was a bipartisan panel with the mandate to "conduct a forward-looking, independent assessment of the current and prospective situation on the ground in Iraq, its impact on the surrounding region, and consequences for U.S. interests." The group produced the Iraq Study Group Report in 2006.

Student involvement

Jesse Jones Summer Leadership Center
Students secure their internships independently of the institute, but get support from experts and staff members. The mission of the program is to "offer Rice University undergraduate students hands-on experience in the world of public policy research and analysis in our nation's capital." The program was founded in 2004 and since its inception, the program has funded 141 students to work in Washington, D.C. for the summer.

Moscow Summer Intern Program 
Undergraduates from Rice and other U.S. universities can apply for a two-week summer space policy program which "combines visits to Russian space facilities with tours of cultural and historical sites in and around the Moscow Oblast region" as well as working in teams "to develop simulated interplanetary space missions" with students from Bauman Moscow State Technical University.

Baker Institute Student Forum 
In 2002, a group of students began the Baker Institute Student Forum, with the goal of "increasing students’ interest in exploring and contributing to the resolution of pressing policy issues." Alongside the forum’s usual activities and events, BISF holds an annual student policy competition, in which students analyze policy issues and offer recommendations according to a specified topic. The Baker Institute also publishes BISF's "undergraduate journal of scholarship in domestic and international public policy," the Rice Journal of Public Policy.

Graduate programs 
The Master of Global Affairs Program is a two-year professional master of arts degree developed by the Baker Institute for Public Policy and Rice's School of Social Sciences. The program faculty come from both the School of Social Sciences and the Baker Institute.

The Master of Energy Economics Program is a 12-month professional master's program in energy economics, developed by the Baker Institute for Public Policy and the Rice Economics Department.

References

External links

Rice University
Think tanks based in the United States
1993 establishments in Texas
New Classical architecture
Think tanks established in 1993